Donald McGregor Morrison (December 4, 1906 – March 9, 1989) was a Vice Admiral in the United States Coast Guard who served as the 8th Vice Commandant from 1962 to 1964.

References

United States Coast Guard admirals
1906 births
1989 deaths
Vice Commandants of the United States Coast Guard